Hear Me Now may refer to:

Albums
 Hear Me Now (Secondhand Serenade album) or the title song, 2010
 Hear Me Now, by Donovan, 1971

Songs
 "Hear Me Now" (Alok and Bruno Martini song), 2016
 "Hear Me Now" (The Green Children song), 2006
 "Hear Me Now" (Hollywood Undead song), 2010
 "Hear Me Now", by Bad Wolves from Disobey, 2018
 "Hear Me Now", by Boyce Avenue from All We Have Left, 2010
 "Hear Me Now", by Casey Donovan from Off the Grid & Somewhere in Between, 2017
 "Hear Me Now", by Framing Hanley from The Moment, 2007
 "Hear Me Now?", by Khalil from Prove It All, 2017

See also
 Can You Hear Me Now? (disambiguation)